Tracy Alloway is a financial journalist and podcaster at Bloomberg News, based in New York as of 2022. She co-hosts the weekly Odd Lots podcast with Joe Weisenthal. In 2022, she and Weisenthal were nominated for a Webby Award for best business podcast.

Career 
Alloway is also an Executive Editor for Bloomberg News and the co-host of 'Bloomberg Daybreak Middle East.'

Outside of journalism, Alloway is a frequent moderator for financial industry events such as the Milken Institute Conference.

She has previously been based in London, New York, and Abu Dhabi.

From 2008-2015, she was at the Financial Times, where she covered capital markets and served as deputy editor of FT Alphaville.

Education 
She holds a B.Sc. in International Relations from the London School of Economics and a postgraduate degree in periodical journalism from the University of Westminster.

References 

Living people
Year of birth missing (living people)
American journalists
Bloomberg L.P. people
American women podcasters
American podcasters